Christopher Michael Taub, M.D. is a fictional character on the Fox medical drama House. He is portrayed by Peter Jacobson. He becomes a member of House's new diagnostic team in Season 4 Episode 9 which is titled as "Games".

Professional life
Taub is a plastic surgeon and was #39 during the episode "games" used by House to select his new team. House almost fired Taub (and the row he was sitting in) on the first day of the episode, but Taub was saved when House changed his mind after noticing an attractive woman in the group. He also reveals his utmost willingness among all the applicants to challenge House's authority, even telling a patient's father that he thinks House is wrong and can have him removed from the case ("Ugly"). Lisa Cuddy later favors Taub as one of her two choices for the team, arguing that his knowledge and combative nature would keep House focused (it is later revealed that she had chosen Taub and Kutner, the two male applicants because she suspected that House would defy her suggestion and choose at least one female candidate). In the sixth season, Taub quit Princeton-Plainsboro Teaching Hospital (PPTH) and returned to his plastic surgery practice during the brief period Eric Foreman led the diagnostics team after House's departure in the episode "Epic Fail", saying he had only joined the team "to work with House." When House returned to PPTH in the episode "Teamwork", House brought Taub back into the team along with Thirteen, Robert Chase, and Foreman. In the episode "Lockdown," it is revealed that Taub has an outstanding educational and early professional profile. He also expressed frustration that he has not continued the same level of success in his current professional career and is now working for people of a younger age. Taub interviewed Martha Masters for medical school.

Personal life
Taub is married to Rachel. Even though he loves his wife, he has been unfaithful to her. He had a successful career in cosmetic surgery, but that ended after he had an affair with a partner's daughter or in some cases nurse, based on different versions of the story. When asked why he gave up his chosen practice completely, he simply says, "I love my wife." His partners signed a non-disclosure agreement (with respect to his affair) and Taub signed a non-compete, meaning he could no longer practice cosmetic surgery.

In spite of this, he has shown indicators for future adultery, admitting to House, "Some people pop pills. I cheat. We all have our vices." (It has been confirmed in "Open and Shut", where Taub proceeds to cheat with the young nurse although the "affair circle" seems to have ended.) In the episode "Mirror Mirror", the patient with a rare type of Mirror syndrome (which causes him to take on the persona of someone in the room with him), sees that he is attracted to Amber Volakis' dominant personality, and the two share a flirtatiously combative dialogue. In the episode "Whatever It Takes", Taub reveals that he is Jewish, though it is revealed in "Don't Ever Change" that he describes himself as a non-practicing. This is supported by the fact that House often alludes to Taub's religion, e.g. giving him a "Gold Star of David" for identifying intracranial pressure in a patient.

In the episode "Adverse Events", Lucas, House's PI, finds out that Taub's wife Rachel opened a secret bank account. House tells Taub that she's put $83,000 in it. When Taub confronts her about it, she tells him she's been saving up to buy him the car he wanted as a surprise because she knew he'd never buy it himself. When she finally gives him the car he apparently decides to tell her he cheated on her, but the conversation isn't shown in the episode. In the "Birthmarks" episode, he claims to have told her, and indicates that she has not thrown him out, and that they are talking about how to handle their situation. In the episode "The Itch", it is revealed that he had been sleeping on the couch, and by the end of the episode his wife had finally forgiven him. In the 100th episode, "The Greater Good", Taub mentions wanting to possibly have children, although his wife seems opposed to the idea.

In "Here Kitty", Taub is revealed to have attended the Collegiate School for high school. In the same episode, he meets with an old classmate from there who, unbeknownst to Taub, was a con artist posing as the CEO of a medical technology firm. Taub was very nearly duped into investing a significant sum of his savings in the company through his friend, and was only prevented from doing so when a sympathetic secretary at the company told him that his friend had been arrested, and was merely a temp., instead of the CEO as he had led Taub to believe.

In "Painless", he states his opinion that suicide is never a solution. Kutner questions him, convinced that anyone so thoroughly opposed to it must carry some sort of baggage associated with it. Taub later tells Kutner that a colleague of his once attempted suicide and though he survived, his family and friends were deeply disturbed. When Kutner asks if it was in fact Taub who attempted suicide, Taub denies it; however, when House assumes the same thing in "Simple Explanation", he does not. After Kutner's suicide, Taub is angry and withdrawn, focusing intently on their current patient even when Chase confronts him about it, telling him to "go home and cry". He does not attend Kutner's funeral, but rather stays to watch over the team's patient. Later, however, he is seen weeping on a bench in the hallway. 

In "Open and Shut", the team treat a woman in an open marriage; Taub brings up the subject with his wife, who has mixed feelings about it. He pledges faithfulness to her, but the episode ends with him going out with a flirty physical therapist.

In "Larger than Life", Taub decides to divorce Rachel because she had turned to an online relationship for comfort and no longer loved him the way she used to. Taub consequently moves in with Foreman following a stint living in a hotel room.

House states that Taub is 45 years old in "You Must Remember This". In "Bombshells", the insight with which he deduces a patient is suffering from a major depressive disorder leads the patient to suspect that Taub, too, suffered from depression, which he does not deny, and Taub admits to having "hurt" himself in that time of his life.

Taub begins a brief relationship with a Certified Nursing Assistant (CNA) who works at the hospital after his failed marriage with Rachel. However, it is revealed in "After Hours" that Taub is still seeing his wife for brief promiscuous encounters. Also in "After Hours" it is revealed that Taub's new tryst Ruby has become pregnant, and Taub breaks down and goes to a strip club with Foreman. Taub assumes he will be a horrible father and, after almost being shot by a dancer from the club he attended (whom Taub unwittingly fondled and later was checking the dancer's mole if the same is malignant or not), he decided to confront Ruby about the matter of whether or not to keep their baby. Taub references a patient he had during his plastic surgery career who accepted death without fear due to having children, and tells Ruby he wants to keep the baby. In the final episode of season 7 "Moving On" Taub's (ex) wife Rachel confronts him at the hospital, and tells him that she is also pregnant. At the end of season 7 it is unclear whether or not either of the women who are pregnant with Taub's baby know, or will know, about the other. In the season 8 episode "The Confession", it is revealed that both of Taub's children are girls, one named Sophie and the other named Sophia.

References

External links
Official House Site

House (TV series) characters
Fictional physicians
Fictional American Jews
Television characters introduced in 2007
Fictional plastic surgeons